János Simon (1 March 1929 – 31 October 2010) was a Hungarian basketball player who competed in the 1952 Summer Olympics and 1960 Summer Olympics. He was born in Budapest-Budafok.

Simon was part of the Hungarian basketball team, which was eliminated after the group stage of the 1952 tournament. He played all six matches. Simon also played in the 1960 Summer Olympics where his team finished ninth.

References

1929 births
2010 deaths
Hungarian men's basketball players
Olympic basketball players of Hungary
Basketball players at the 1952 Summer Olympics
Basketball players at the 1960 Summer Olympics
FIBA EuroBasket-winning players
Basketball players from Budapest